The McMahan House at 203 Washington St. in La Grange, Kentucky was built in c.1820 as a brick I-house.  It was listed on the National Register of Historic Places in 1982.

It is notable as "the only remaining early nineteenth century structure in LaGrange, Kentucky. As such, the five-bay brick I-house is the town's only tangible link with its early settlement and building period. The double-stretcher Flemish bond of the north facade and the remaining interior Federal moldings and mantles are evidence of the building's early construction date...."

It is a contributing building in the Central La Grange Historic District, which is also listed on the National Register.

References

McMahan
Houses on the National Register of Historic Places in Kentucky
Houses completed in 1820
National Register of Historic Places in Oldham County, Kentucky
1820 establishments in Kentucky
Individually listed contributing properties to historic districts on the National Register in Kentucky
La Grange, Kentucky